Owen James 'Jem' Evans (1867 - 14 October 1942) was a Welsh rugby union half-back who played club rugby for Cardiff and international rugby for Wales. Evans was one of the earliest half-backs to play for Wales and was awarded four caps between 1887 and 1888, though never with the same partner.

Rugby career
Evans was first selected for Wales in the opening game of the 1887 Home Nations Championship, played in Llanelli against the English team. Evans was partnered with team captain and Newport player Charlie Newman. The Welsh team held England to a nil - nil draw, their best result to that date, and Evans was reselected for the next game of the Championship, away to Scotland. On this occasion, Evans was partnered with new cap George Bowen of Swansea, the Welsh captaincy going to Bob Gould. The match was a humiliation for Wales, with Scotland running in 12 tries without reply. The Welsh selectors reacted with massive restructuring of the back positions, with only Arthur 'Monkey' Gould keeping his place. Bowen and Evans were replaced by John Goulstone Lewis and William Stadden.

The next season Evans was back in favour, and was partnered with Cardiff team-mate Stadden, to face Scotland as part of the 1888 Championship. Wales beat Scotland, a historic first victory over the Scots, thanks to a single try from Thomas Pryce-Jenkins. Evans final international game was the second and last Welsh game of the 1888 Championship. Played away at Lansdowne Road against Ireland, Evans was linked up with yet another new half-back pairing, Newport's Charlie Thomas. An underperforming Wales lost the match and Evans did not represent his country again.

International games played
Wales
  1887
  1888
  1887, 1888

Bibliography

References

1867 births
1942 deaths
Welsh rugby union players
Rugby union players from Cardiff
Cardiff RFC players
Wales international rugby union players